FC Monmouth are a soccer club based in Monmouth County, New Jersey. They play in the Northeast Region's Keystone Conference of the National Premier Soccer League, the fourth division of the American soccer pyramid. The team plays its home games at Count Basie Park in Red Bank

History
FC Monmouth was founded in 2017 by Jacco de Bruijn, Simon Nynens, Mattia Buffolino, John Kiely, Corbett Donato, Stavros Memtsoudis (all Monmouth County locals), and Federico Girardi. FC Monmouth was assigned to compete in the National Premier Soccer League, the fourth tier of the American Soccer Pyramid, roughly equal to the USL Premier Development League, starting in 2018. On February 7, 2018, it was announced that Brian Woods, the head coach for William Paterson University's men's soccer team, would be the head coach for FC Monmouth's inaugural season. FC Monmouth concluded their first season unbeaten at their home stadium, Count Basie Stadium in Red Bank, New Jersey.  They advanced into the playoffs of the Keystone Conference, only to lose against eventual National Cup finalists FC Motown. The inaugural season was widely viewed as a success, as it brought communities in Monmouth County together around the sport of soccer. An official supporters club, "The 732 SC" was founded with its base in Rumson, New Jersey.

FC Monmouth returned to play for the 2021 National Premier Soccer League season after the 2020 season was cancelled due to COVID-19. After completing the regular season with a 4th-place finish in the Keystone Conference, FC Monmouth advanced to their first ever Keystone Conference final, eventually losing to FC Motown.

Year-by-year

References

External links
 

National Premier Soccer League teams
Soccer clubs in the New York metropolitan area
2017 establishments in New Jersey
Association football clubs established in 2017